William I of Geneva ( – 25 July 1195) was Count of Geneva from 1178 to 1195. He was the son of Amadeus I, Count of Geneva and Matilda de Cuiseaux.

William married Agnes of Savoy. They had:
Humbert

Following his first wife's death c. 1172, William married Marguerite Beatrice de Faucigny, they had:
Marguerite of Geneva, wife of Thomas I of Savoy
William II of Geneva

William's third marriage, to Beatrice de Vaupergue, his last wife was childless. He died at the Château de Novel in Annecy, France.

References

Sources

Counts of Geneva
House of Geneva
12th-century nobility
1130s births
1195 deaths
Year of birth uncertain